Julian Schauerte (born 2 April 1988) is a German professional footballer who plays as a right-back for 1. FC Kaan-Marienborn.

Club career
Schauerte comes from Grafschaft a locality in the municipality Schmallenberg. He was born in the neighboring town of Lennestadt and grew up in the town of Schmallenberg. He first played for DJK Grafschaft in the youth before switching to Bayer Leverkusen in 2001.

Schauerte moved to Fortuna Düsseldorf in the 2014–15 season.

In the season 2018–19 he played for K.A.S. Eupen, a team in the Jupiler Pro League. However, the club announced on 30 May 2019, that they had terminated the contract of the player by mutuel consent.

Seven days later, he signed with SC Preußen Münster for the 2019–20 season.

External links

References

1988 births
Living people
People from Lennestadt
Sportspeople from Arnsberg (region)
German footballers
Footballers from North Rhine-Westphalia
Association football fullbacks
2. Bundesliga players
3. Liga players
Belgian Pro League players
Bayer 04 Leverkusen II players
SV Sandhausen players
Fortuna Düsseldorf players
K.A.S. Eupen players
SC Preußen Münster players
1. FC Kaan-Marienborn players
German expatriate footballers
German expatriate sportspeople in Belgium
Expatriate footballers in Belgium